Emeryville may refer to:

 Emeryville, California
 Emeryville, Ontario
 Emeryville, predecessor of International Transtar, a model of International Harvester truck

See also
 Emoryville